Sylvaine Deltour (born August 25, 1953) is a French sprint canoer who competed in the mid-1970s. At the 1976 Summer Olympics in Montreal, she was eliminated in the semifinals of the K-2 500 m event.

References
Sports-reference.com profile

1953 births
Canoeists at the 1976 Summer Olympics
French female canoeists
Living people
Olympic canoeists of France
Place of birth missing (living people)